My Future Boyfriend is a television film starring Sara Rue and Barry Watson. It premiered on ABC Family on April 10, 2011.  It is directed by Michael Lange.

Synopsis
P-A-X-497/341 (aka Pax), a curious human from a well-ordered but loveless year 3127, travels back in time to the year 2011 to satisfy his curiosity about such archaic concepts as love, passion and sex, after finding a book by newly published romance novelist Elizabeth Barrett, who also works at a newspaper that deals in primarily made up stories. He is told that love caused people to act strangely and was one of the root causes for suffering in the world. He decided to go back to the year 2011 to figure what love is. He winds up making his own discoveries when he meets Elizabeth, who turns out to be the woman of his dreams. Unfortunately, Elizabeth has a boyfriend, Richard. When Pax doesn't return to the future by the given deadline, his fellow scientist Bob travels back in time to find him. Upon returning to the future Pax misses Elizabeth and, she is the only thing he is thinking about. He also feels he has lost his chance with her. Bob lets Pax travel all the way back to where Elizabeth and Richard met, which allows Pax to meet Elizabeth first.

Cast
Sara Rue as Elizabeth Barrett   
Barry Watson as Pax 
Fred Willard as Bob
TJ Hassan as Fred Smatters
Jordan Wall as Theo Nyborg
Justin Smith as Richard Babcock
Valerie Harper as Bobbi Moreau 
Ryan Felton as PROFAX, a HAL 9000-like intelligent computer
Adam Boyer as Agent Curt Redding

References

External links
 
Review on io9

2011 television films
2011 films
ABC Family original films
Films about time travel
Films set in 2011
Films set in the future
Films directed by Michael Lange
2010s English-language films